Philip Clive Dent (born 14 February 1950) is a former professional tennis player. Dent's high water mark as a pro singles player was reaching the Australian Open final in 1974, which he lost to Jimmy Connors in four sets. Dent was also the men's doubles champion at the Australian Open in 1975 (with teammate John Alexander), and the mixed-doubles champion at the US Open in 1976 (with teammate Billie Jean King).

Tennis career
As well as his victory in the 1975 Australian Open doubles, Dent reached six more men's doubles finals in Grand Slam Tournaments, finishing runner-up at the Australian Open in 1970, 1973, and 1977, the French Open in 1975 and 1979 and Wimbledon in 1977. Dent was a member of the Australian tennis teams that won the Davis Cup in 1977 and the World Team Cup in 1979.

Before turning professional, Dent won the boys' singles titles at both the Australian Open tournament and at the French Open in 1968.

During his professional career, Dent won three top-level singles titles (in Sydney and in Brisbane, Australia, both in 1979, and the former also in 1971) and 25 doubles titles (also winning the 1968 Australian Hard Courts singles event in Launceston). His career-high singles ranking was world No. 12 (in 1977). Dent retired from professional tennis in 1983.

Since retiring as a player, Dent has settled in Newport Beach, California. Dent was married to Betty Ann Grubb Stuart and their son, Taylor Dent was also a professional tennis player and citizen of the United States.

Dent defeated Björn Borg in the third round of the 1974 Australian Open, the only Australian Open in which he competed.

Grand Slam finals

Singles: 1 (1 runner-up)

Mixed doubles: 1 (1 title)

Grand Slam performance timeline

Singles

Note: The Australian Open was held twice in 1977, in January and December.

Career finals

Doubles (25 titles, 25 runner-ups)

References

External links
 
 
 
 

1950 births
Living people
Australian emigrants to the United States
Australian male tennis players
Australian Open (tennis) champions
French Open junior champions
People from Newport Beach, California
Tennis players from Sydney
US Open (tennis) champions
Grand Slam (tennis) champions in mixed doubles
Grand Slam (tennis) champions in men's doubles
Grand Slam (tennis) champions in boys' singles
Grand Slam (tennis) champions in boys' doubles